The FIBA Oceania Championship for Women 2003 was the qualifying tournament of FIBA Oceania for the 2004 Summer Olympics. Australia won all three games to qualify for the Oceanic spot in the Olympics.

Results

References

FIBA Oceania Championship
Championship
2003 in New Zealand basketball
2003–04 in Australian basketball
International basketball competitions hosted by Australia
Australia women's national basketball team games
New Zealand women's national basketball team games